Denník N is a Slovak daily newspaper and a news website which was founded by the former members of the editorial board of SME in 2014.

History 
In 2014, the Namav, a subject subvenced by the Penta Investments group, announced the purchase of Petit Press, the publisher of the newspaper. In reaction, a major part of the editorial board, including the editor-in-chief, announced their resignation. "We are leaving SME and we will try to create a new medium that no one will suspect that it serves someone other than the readers", stated Matúš Kostolný, the departing editor-in-chief.

Following the example of the Slovak newspaper, the Czech newspaper Deník N was created in 2018, in which Denník N owns 33.3 percent of the shares and provided his know-how.

Denník N published threema chat logs of the Slovak businessman Marián Kočner in March 2019, which prove that he was able to pursue his far-reaching criminal business for years with the toleration or active assistance of many Slovak politicians, prosecutors and judges. Against Kocner is determined as the alleged commissioner of the murder of the investigative journalists Ján Kuciak and Martina Kušnírová. The murder triggered the 2018 crisis in Slovakia.

References

See also 

 SME

Newspapers published in Slovakia